St. Mary's Nurses' Residence is a historic residence hall located at Niagara Falls in Niagara County, New York.  It was constructed in 1928 as a Diploma School for nurses affiliated with the Mount St. Mary's Hospital, operated by the Sisters of St. Francis. After being abandoned for 20 years, it was redeveloped as "Carolyn's House"; a transitional home and job-training center for homeless women and their children operated by the YWCA of Niagara.

It was listed on the National Register of Historic Places in 2004.

References

Residential buildings on the National Register of Historic Places in New York (state)
Neoclassical architecture in New York (state)
Residential buildings completed in 1928
Buildings and structures in Niagara Falls, New York
National Register of Historic Places in Niagara County, New York